The Order of Ho Chi Minh is a decoration of the Socialist Republic of Vietnam that was first instituted on 6 June 1947. The creator of the order was the president Hồ Chí Minh.

The Order of Ho Chi Minh is conferred or posthumously conferred on individuals who have rendered great meritorious services, recorded numerous outstanding achievements in one of the political, economic, social, literature, art, scientific, technological, defense, security, diplomatic or other domains.

When first instituted, the Ho Chi Minh Order had 3 classes, but since 1981 the Order has become a single one. Currently, the Ho Chi Minh Order is the second highest national order of the Socialist Republic of Vietnam (after the Gold Star). The Order is bestowed on citizens who have rendered outstanding services to the State, or members of the Vietnamese People's Armed Forces for acts of bravery in action against an enemy force. The decoration may also be awarded to cities, regions, collectives, military units and ships for the same reasons.

Gallery

See also
 Vietnam awards and decorations

References

Orders, decorations, and medals of Vietnam
Awards established in 1947
1947 establishments in Vietnam